Kempas is a suburb in Johor Bahru, Johor, Malaysia. The Kempas Medical Centre is located in Kempas.

Transportation
The suburb is accessible by Causeway Link route 112 from Johor Bahru Sentral railway station.

References 

Towns and suburbs in Johor Bahru District
Populated places in Johor